"Going to a Disco" is an electro-funk-dance song written by Lynsey de Paul and Mike Moran, and released as the duo's second penned single for Martyn Ford on Mountain Records (catalog number TOP30), released on the 12 August 1977 in the UK and Europe. This was the first Mountain label single to be distributed by Phonogram and had the characteristic moulded plastic label. The recording was produced by Ford and John Punter, and was the follow up release to Ford's UK hit single, "Let Your Body Go Downtown". It was also released as a 12 inch single.

References

1977 singles
Songs written by Lynsey de Paul
1974 songs
Songs written by Michael Moran (music producer)